This is a comprehensive listing of official releases by Ed Bruce, an American country music songwriter and singer. He released twenty-two country studio albums, two Christian studio albums, two rock singles, and 51 Country music singles.

His best known song is "Mammas Don't Let Your Babies Grow Up to Be Cowboys".

Albums and compilations
{|class="wikitable"
|-
!Year
!Title
!US Country
|-
| 1968
| If I Could Just Go Home
| align=center|44
|-
| 1969
| Shades of Ed Bruce
| align=center|—
|-
| 1976
| Ed Bruce
| align=center|—
|-
| 1977
| The Tennessean
| align=center|—
|-
| 1978
| Cowboys & Dreamers
| align=center|—
|-
| 1979
| Taste of Honey
| align=center|—
|-
| rowspan=2|1980
| Ed Bruce
| align=center|22
|-
| King of the Road
| align=center|—
|-
| 1981
| One to One
| align=center|29
|-
| rowspan=2|1982
| Last Train to Clarkesville
| align=center|—
|-
| I Write It Down
| align=center|63
|-
| rowspan=2|1983
| You're Not Leavin' Here Tonight
| align=center|35
|-
| ''The Singing Sheriff of the TV Series 'MAVERICK| align=center|—
|-
| rowspan=2|1984
| Tell 'em I've Gone Crazy
| align=center|—
|-
| Homecoming
| align=center|41
|-
| 1985
| Greatest Hits
| align=center|—
|-
| rowspan=3|1986
| Night Things
| align=center|53
|-
| Rock Boppin' Baby
| align=center|—
|-
| Thirty-Nine and Holding
| align=center|—
|-
| rowspan=2|1995
| Puzzles
| align=center|—
|-
| The Best of Ed Bruce
| align=center|—
|-
| 1997
| Set Me Free
| align=center|—
|-
| 2002
| This Old Hat
| align=center|—
|-
| 2003
| 12 Classics
| align=center|—
|-
| 2004
| Changed
| align=center|—
|-
| 2006
| Ed Bruce (A.K.A Edwin Bruce) Selected Hits
| align=center|—
|-
| rowspan=2|2007
| Cowboys
| align=center|—
|-
| Sing About Jesus
| align=center|—
|-
| 2008
| Country Hits
| align=center|—
|-
| 2010
| In Jesus' Eyes - Songs of Inspiration
| align=center|—
|-
| 2011
| The Last Cowboy Song
| align=center|—
|-
| 2013
| Country Hits
| align=center|—
|-
| 2015
| Back to Back
| align=center|—
|-
| 2017
| Ed Bruce Live from Church Street Station
| align=center|—
|-
| rowspan=2|2018
| Girls, Women & Ladies
| align=center|—
|-
| The Last Cowboy Song
| align=center|—
|-
| 2019
| Ed Bruce Meets Faron Young
| align=center|—
|-
| 2021
| See The Big Man Cry
| align=center|—
|}

Singles
1950s and 1960s

1970s

1980s

Notes

A^''' "See the Big Man Cry" peaked at number 9 on Bubbling Under Hot 100 Singles.

References

External links
Official website

Country music discographies
Discographies of American artists